Paul Dimattina (born 22 November 1974) is a former Australian rules footballer who represented  in the Australian Football League (AFL). Dimattina is of Italian descent and the son of former fruiterer Frank Dimattina.

Dimattina played for Richmond at Under 19 level as a 16 year in 1991 and was drafted by them with the final selection in the 1991 AFL draft. He played reserves football for them in 1992, but never played an AFL game for Richmond.  During 1993 and 1994 he played for Victorian Football Association (VFA) team Sandringham, as well as some games for the Carlton and Essendon reserves teams. Drafted by the Footscray Football Club (later Western Bulldogs) with the 26th selection in the 1995 Pre-season draft, Dimattina made his AFL debut late in the 1995 season. Dimattina was a high possession winner for the Bulldogs throughout his career. He played 131 games for the Bulldogs until he was delisted at the end of the 2003 season.

Post AFL career
In 2005, Dimattina moved to the Gold Coast, Queensland, where he played with the Southport Sharks. He scored six goals and best afield in the Queensland State League Grand Final before retiring from the Sharks and returning to Melbourne.

Post football
Following his football career, Dimattina became involved in the hospitality industry. He and his family own and run the Dimattina's and Il Gambero restaurants in Lygon Street, Carlton, Society Restaurant in Melbourne City, the Blue Train cafe at Southgate in Southbank, as well as two restaurants on the Gold Coast, Queensland.

References

External links

1974 births
Living people
Australian rules footballers from Victoria (Australia)
Australian people of Italian descent
Sandringham Football Club players
Southport Australian Football Club players
Western Bulldogs players
People educated at Marcellin College, Bulleen
21st-century Australian businesspeople
Australian food industry businesspeople